Felipe Ruvalcaba Cisneros (16 February 1941 – 4 September 2019) was a Mexican professional football forward who played for Mexico in the 1962 and 1966 FIFA World Cups. He also played for CD Oro and he competed in the men's tournament at the 1964 Summer Olympics.

References

External links
FIFA profile

1941 births
2019 deaths
Mexican footballers
Mexico international footballers
Association football forwards
CD Oro footballers
1962 FIFA World Cup players
1966 FIFA World Cup players
Olympic footballers of Mexico
Footballers at the 1964 Summer Olympics
Liga MX players